Mount Reynolds is a snow-capped mountain, 1,130 m, marked by steep, rocky lower slopes, standing at the south side of Violante Inlet, on the east coast of Palmer Land. Discovered by members of the United States Antarctic Service (USAS) in a flight from East Base on 30 December 1940. Named by the US-SCAN for Jeremiah (John) N. Reynolds, longtime protagonist (1826–38) of American exploration and expansion in the Pacific and the Antarctic.

Mountains of Palmer Land